Tanaboon Kesarat (born 21 September 1993) is a Thai professional footballer who plays as a defensive midfielder or a centre-back for Thai League 1 club Port and the Thailand national team.

Personal life
Tanaboon's brother, Somjets Kesarat, also plays football as a midfielder.

Statistics

International

International goals

Honours

Club
BEC Tero Sasana
 Thai League Cup (1): 2014

Muangthong United
 Thai League 1 (1): 2016
 Thai League Cup (1): 2016

Chiangrai United
 Thai FA Cup (1): 2017

Port
 Thai FA Cup (1): 2019

International
Thailand U-23
 SEA Games  Gold Medal (2): 2013, 2015

Thailand
 AFF Championship (2): 2014, 2016
 King's Cup (2): 2016, 2017

Individual
 Thai League 1 Player of the Month (2): May 2013, April 2016

References

External links

Tanaboon Kesarat at Soccerway

1993 births
Living people
Tanaboon Kesarat
Tanaboon Kesarat
Association football midfielders
Tanaboon Kesarat
Tanaboon Kesarat
Tanaboon Kesarat
Tanaboon Kesarat
Tanaboon Kesarat
Tanaboon Kesarat
Tanaboon Kesarat
Tanaboon Kesarat
Tanaboon Kesarat
Tanaboon Kesarat
Footballers at the 2014 Asian Games
Tanaboon Kesarat
Southeast Asian Games medalists in football
2019 AFC Asian Cup players
Competitors at the 2013 Southeast Asian Games
Competitors at the 2015 Southeast Asian Games
Tanaboon Kesarat